Major-General John Talbot Wentworth Reeve CB, CBE, DSO (19 April 1891 − 25 June 1983) was a British Army who served in both of the world wars.

Military career
Born in Lincolnshire and educated at Eton College, Reeve attended and later graduated from the Royal Military College, Sandhurst, from where he was commissioned into the Rifle Brigade (The Prince Consort's Own) in 1911.

He served throughout the First World War, mainly on the Western Front in France and Belgium, and, after being promoted to captain in 1915, he ended the war having been mentioned in dispatches and was awarded the Distinguished Service Order (DSO) in 1919, the same year in which he married.

The interwar period saw Reeve remain in the army and transferred to the Royal Artillery, which was followed by attendance and subsequent graduation from the Staff College, Camberley from 1924 to 1925, where Noel Irwin, Douglas Graham, Vyvyan Pope and Thomas Riddell-Webster were among his many fellow students that year who ultimately became general officers. Following this, he served from 1926 to 1930 as a staff officer at the War Office in London before transferring from the Royal Artillery back to the Rifle Brigade, where he commanded the regiment's 1st Battalion from 1936 to 1938. 1938 saw him promoted to the temporary rank of brigadier and placed in command of the Hong Kong Infantry Brigade in Hong Kong, China. He held this position until late 1941, two years after the outbreak of the Second World War.

Returning to the United Kingdom, he became Deputy Adjutant General with Home Forces from 1942 to 1943, the same year in which, on 15 May, he was promoted to the acting rank of major-general. He then became commander of Sussex District until 1944 when he was made Deputy Adjutant General with Middle East Command, then commanded by General Sir Bernard Paget. He held this post until 1946 when, after over thirty-five years of military service, he retired from the army and was also made a Companion of the Order of the Bath.

His only son having been killed in action in the North African campaign in 1942, his wife also died soon after Reeve's retirement, in 1949. He married again the following year and retired to Bury St Edmonds in Suffolk, where he spent the rest of his life until his death on 25 June 1983, at the age of 92.

References

Bibliography

External links
Generals of World War II

1891 births
1983 deaths
British Army personnel of World War I
British Army generals of World War II
Rifle Brigade officers
Royal Artillery officers
People educated at Eton College
Graduates of the Royal Military College, Sandhurst
Graduates of the Staff College, Camberley
Companions of the Distinguished Service Order
Companions of the Order of the Bath
Commanders of the Order of the British Empire
Military personnel from Lincolnshire